Auraria was a small mining settlement in the Kansas Territory in the United States. Today it survives in its original location as a neighborhood of Denver, Colorado, south of the confluence of Cherry Creek and the South Platte River.

Geography
Auraria is located in central Denver. It is just west of downtown Denver and is shaped roughly like a triangle. It borders Colfax Avenue on the south, Cherry Creek to the northeast, and South Platte River to the northwest.

History 
On October 3, 1858, a group of Georgia prospectors led by Green Russell establish the townsite of Auraria south of Cherry Creek near the Cherry Creek Diggings, over a month before a group of Kansas Territory speculators led by William Larimer established the rival Denver City on the other side of Cherry Creek. Henry Allen, a surveyor, laid the town platte and was Auraria town company's first president. The town was named for the gold mining settlement of Auraria, Georgia. On October 29, Charles H. Blake and A.J. Williams opened a mercantile business out of wagons in Auraria.

Henry Allen was the first postmaster of Auraria. On January 18, 1859, the first post office in the future State of Colorado opened in Auraria. On, April 15, 1859, ten delegates from six communities in the Pike's Peak Country met in convention at Dick Wooton’s store in Auraria to pass resolutions to organize a Provisional State of Jefferson. On April 23, William Byers published the first edition of the Rocky Mountain News, the Rocky Mountain region's first newspaper, at Auraria. At an election on September 24, voters rejected the proposed state, but on October 24, voters approved the establishment of the Provisional Government of the Territory of Jefferson.

Auraria ceased to exist as a separate town on December 3, 1859, when the Jefferson Territory granted a charter to the consolidated City of Denver, Auraria, and Highland, which would come to be known as just Denver City, the territorial capital and seat of Arrappahoe County. The Jefferson Territory was itself superseded on February 28, 1861, when U.S. President James Buchanan signed An Act to provide a temporary Government for the Territory of Colorado.

Auraria suffered a devastating flood on May 19, 1864. In response, many businesses left the neighborhood for Denver proper. Some speculate that Auraria never truly recovered from this event.

In the 1960s and 1970s, Auraria became the focal point for urban renewal in Denver. It was decided that the neighborhood would be converted to a campus to house the University of Colorado Denver, Metropolitan State University, and the Community College of Denver. Demolition of old Auraria began on March 10, 1973. A few buildings from old Auraria are still standing today.

The name "Auraria" survives in Denver as the neighborhood along the west bank of Cherry Creek to the east bank of the South Platte River, bordered on the south by Colfax Avenue. Auraria is easily confused with, but is entirely distinct from the City of Aurora, Denver's neighbor some six miles to the east.

Arts and culture

Attractions
Elitch Gardens
Auraria Campus
Ninth Street Historic Park
Emmanuel Shearith Israel Chapel - Denver's oldest church building
Tivoli Student Union
St. Cajetan’s Church - Historic Hispanic church 
St. Elizabeth's Church - Only active church on the Auraria campus
Auraria Library
Ball Arena

Sports
Auraria contains the Ball Arena arena, home of the Colorado Avalanche, Denver Nuggets, and Colorado Mammoth, as well as the venue of concerts and other events.

Education

The neighborhood of Auraria is dominated by the Auraria Campus, which is home to three institutions of higher learning: University of Colorado Denver (CU Denver), Metropolitan State University of Denver (MSU Denver), and Community College of Denver (CCD). Vestiges of the old neighborhood remain, however, in the Ninth Street Historic Park on the campus. The three institutions occupy the bulk of the Auraria Neighborhood, so there is very little permanent residence. The schools mainly serve commuter students, though housing has recently been developed at Campus Village Apartments (UCD), Auraria Student Lofts, and Regency Student Housing.

Media
There are two student newspapers that are published in Auraria. The University of Colorado Denver's newspaper is called the "CU Denver Sentry" and Metropolitan State University's newspaper is "Met Media".

Transportation

Auraria is serviced by the Regional Transportation District. It has two light rail stations within its boundaries: the Colfax at Auraria station and the Auraria West station.

References

Colorado Mining Boom
Neighborhoods in Denver
Former colonial and territorial capitals in the United States
History of Denver
Populated places established in 1858
1858 establishments in Kansas Territory